The Jimmy & Rosalynn Carter Work Project - formerly the Jimmy Carter Work Project (JCWP) - is an annual home building blitz organized by Habitat for Humanity International and its affiliates. It generally takes place in the United States one year, and an international location the next.  President Jimmy Carter and Rosalynn Carter helped Habitat volunteers renovate the 19-unit building, and media coverage brought attention to Habitat, which had been founded in 1976 in Americus, Georgia, a short distance from Carter's hometown of Plains, Georgia. Even though President Carter has said repeatedly he never intended to start an annual project, the following year  the Carters returned to the same site to finish the renovation work. On Oct. 10, 2013, as part of the 30th annual project, the Carters returned to the building and met with families living there.

By 2019, the Jimmy & Rosalynn Carter Work Project had helped 4,390 families move into safe, affordable shelter in 14 countries. Over the years, more than 104,000 volunteers from all over the world have signed up to build alongside the Carters.

The Carter Work Projects started modestly and built slowly. Early projects were held in the United States, and were relatively small compared  to later years.

1986
Chicago, Illinois: Following the first two trips to New York City, the Carters moved on to Chicago, where they helped build a four-unit complex on the city's West Side. They were joined by their daughter, Amy, and celebrated their 40th wedding anniversary — July 7, 1986 — on the build site. In years to come, Carter children and grandchildren would frequently volunteer.

1987
Charlotte, North Carolina: Habitat founder Millard Fuller called Charlotte "The Miracle on 19th Street," and comedian Bob Hope was among the volunteers who came to build 14 houses in Charlotte's Optimist Park area. This marked the first year the project was held in tandem with a worldwide Habitat House-Raising Week, in which an additional 300 homes were begun.

1988
Atlanta, Georgia, and Philadelphia, Pennsylvania:  The 1988 build was the first held in two separate locations — a 200-volunteer, 10-unit renovation project in North Philadelphia, and a 1,000- volunteer, 20-house project in Atlanta's Edgewood neighborhood.

1989
Milwaukee, Wisconsin: Plagued with steady, chilly rain, the Milwaukee build was in danger of falling behind schedule. During a live TV interview, President Carter asked for help from local roofers, who started showing up in droves the following morning. They roofed all the houses in one day, and the Milwaukee affiliate received a huge boost in donations and attention that carried it forward. More than 1,000 volunteers finished six homes, and renovated eight others. The broader House-Raising Week in 1989 involved the startup, completion, or rehab of 500 homes.

1990
Tijuana, Mexico, and San Diego, California: By venturing across the border, the Carter Work Project became international for the first time. Nearly 2,000 volunteers lived in a four-acre tent city and divided their time between Tijuana and San Diego; the construction site in Tijuana lacked electricity and running water. President Carter called the build "the most complicated and the most gratifying" so far. The project raised 100 homes in Tijuana and seven in San Diego.

1991
Miami, Florida: Miami's Liberty City erupted in violent riots in 1980 that decimated the neighborhood, and President Carter toured the devastation while in office. More than a decade later he came back to personally rebuild, working on 14 houses and a day care center. "I really enjoyed how all the volunteers, both white and black, came together and helped build for the project," said homeowner Virginia Marshal, who was still living in her Habitat home more than 20 years later.

1992
Washington, D.C., and Baltimore, Maryland:  "Habitat is not a charity organization. We don't believe that the best way to help people is to give them a Santa Claus gift," President Carter said at the groundbreaking ceremony in Washington, D.C. After five days of blitz building, with an international pool of volunteers hammering away, 20 new homeowners in Baltimore and Washington were ready to move in.

1993
Winnipeg, Manitoba, and Waterloo, Ontario, Canada. Canadians from more than 50 communities poured into Winnipeg and Waterloo to build 28 new homes in the first completely international Carter Work Project.

1994
Eagle Butte, South Dakota: President Carter specifically asked to build on a Native American reservation, so the 11th Carter Work Project headed to rural South Dakota. Volunteers slept in tents pitched on the local high school's football field, while the Carters stayed nearby in a traditional teepee provided by the Sioux Indians. Emmanuel Joseph Red Bear II said it was "a dream come true" to build his own home alongside the Carters. Despite heavy storms, the volunteers built 30 new homes on the reservation.

1995
Watts, Los Angeles, California:  Although the Carters concentrated as always on building one home — for Max and Toni Nettles — they hammered ceremonial nails into all 21 houses along East Santa Ana Boulevard in Watts.

1996
Vac, Hungary: As President, Carter had returned Hungary's national crown jewels, which had been taken by the Nazis and later confiscated by U.S. forces to keep them out of Soviet hands. When the project looked toward expanding into Europe, he suggested Hungary. The picturesque small town of Vac (pronounced "Votz"), in a bend of the Danube River a little north of Budapest, was the "most beautiful" project site, he would later say. An international team of 500 volunteers built 10 houses.

1997
Eastern Kentucky and Tennessee: The Appalachian project "Hammering in the Hills" had beautiful backdrops, but the poverty there ran deep. Households in the eight communities served had an average income of less than $13,000 a year, and more than 16 percent lacked indoor plumbing. Among the volunteers participating during the week: First Lady Hillary Rodham Clinton and Speaker of the House Newt Gingrich. The JCWP and affiliated construction around the region built more than 200 new homes, some in partnership with the Federation of Appalachian Housing Enterprises.

1998
Houston, Texas:  The heat soared well into triple digits — a thermometer read 110 degrees on the house where Rosalynn Carter was working in Houston. But the building went on. "I think just the fact that people have a home does something for their self-esteem," she said at the site. President Carter added, "They often get new ambition. They have seen success, and they have seen a promise kept at least one time in their lives." About 6,000 volunteers built 100 homes. That included 25 local prison inmates, six of whom were hired by the local Habitat affiliate after the completion of their sentences.

1999
Philippines: The theme in Tagalog was "Magbayanihan Tayo — "Let us build together" — for the largest and most complicated Carter Work Project ever, with 293 houses at six sites and 14,000 volunteers. Filipino media covered the project relentlessly; more than 150 journalists jockeyed behind a fence to get shots of the Carters as they built simple homes made of concrete blocks with galvanized metal roofs and louvered glass windows.

2000
New York, New York; Jacksonville, Florida; and Sumter County, Georgia: "I didn't think we'd come a second year. I never had any concept it would expand," President Carter told volunteers when the project returned to New York. The Carters and volunteers built 157 houses, including Habitat's 100,000th house in Harlem, and then its 100,001st house in Plains, Georgia, their hometown. Among the celebrities lending a hand: actress Susan Sarandon, who said, "It's a gift to participate in something like this."

2001
South Korea. President Carter first visited South Korea in 1950 as a young submarine officer, and later returned as president and humanitarian. The project's main location, Asan, was dubbed Reconciliation Village, and Carter, in his remarks to volunteers, spoke to that theme: "One word I've heard in South Korea more than any other word is 'reconciliation.' I look on Habitat for Humanity as a movement for reconciliation, a breaking down of barriers… between the rich and the poor." Nine thousand volunteers — including South Korean President Kim Dae-Jung — built 136 houses.

2002
Durban, Kwa-Zulu Natal, South Africa: Less than a decade after the end of legalized racism in South Africa, blacks and whites built side by side in a neighborhood that had been gutted by the government during apartheid. At the opening ceremony, President Carter said he, too, had grown up in a segregated society, and felt a connection to South Africa. "Our family has always been close to this great country," he said. "We'll be working hand in hand together."  Volunteers at the first African project included the presidents of Kenya, Mozambique and Malawi, and Gracia Machel, wife of former South African president Nelson Mandela.

2003
LaGrange and Valdosta, Georgia; and Anniston, Alabama: Heavy rains created ankle-deep mud and alternated with a brutal summer sun as the Carters worked at three build sites, all of them less than 200 miles from their home in Plains, Georgia. Volunteers built 92 houses in 2003.

2004
Puebla and Veracruz, Mexico: About 4,000 volunteers built 150 homes in the two Mexican cities.

2005
Benton Harbor and Detroit, Michigan; and Windsor, Ontario, Canada. Volunteers built 280 homes on this dual-country build, which was documented by the DIY Network in the series "Habitat Homes: Jimmy Carter Work Project". When volunteers showed up Monday morning at the Benton Harbor build site, they found a Labrador mix puppy with no owner. The whole crew adopted her and named her Rosy, for Rosalynn Carter; a volunteer eventually gave her a permanent home.

2006
Lonavala, Maharashtra, India:  In a village not far from where Lillian Carter had once volunteered for the Peace Corps, her son welcomed 2,000 volunteers to build. Among them: actor Brad Pitt, actor John Abraham, cricket star Steve Waugh, and former Miss World Diana Hayden. "I think it's been fun for everyone to have such high-profile people on site," said HFHI CEO Jonathan Reckford. "But their participation helps draw more attention to what Habitat is doing, not only in India, but all across the world."

2007
Los Angeles and San Pedro, California: Although known for new home construction, the Carter Work Project, like Habitat, has embraced new ways of helping people and of mobilizing against poverty housing. In 2007, volunteers repaired 35 Los Angeles homes as part of Habitat's A Brush With Kindness program, in addition to building 30 townhomes and  condos.

2008
U.S. Gulf Coast: During the 25th annual build, nearly 20 Habitat affiliates along the Gulf Coast built new housing in areas that had been hit by Hurricane Katrina in 2005. More than 2,000 volunteers helped build houses with 250 families. The project was officially renamed the Jimmy & Rosalynn Carter Work Project. "That's how it always should have been," said President Carter. "She's been my life partner, she's been on every one of these builds right along with me."

2009
Mekong River Region(China, Laos, Thailand, Cambodia, Vietnam): The Mekong River begins in China and flows south through Laos, Thailand and Cambodia before finding the sea in Vietnam; in 2009 the Carter Work Project built 166 homes throughout all five countries simultaneously. Temperatures in Vietnam climbed into the 90s and many volunteers suffered from the heat, while the weather in Sichuan, China, was so cold that volunteers clustered around portable heaters to get warm.

2010
Washington, D.C.; Baltimore, Maryland; Twin Cities, Minnesota; and Birmingham, Alabama: In honor of President Carter's 86th birthday, volunteers built and rehabbed 86 homes in four locations in 2010. Among the volunteers was President Carter's former vice president, Walter Mondale, who joined him in Minnesota. The President also joined the Blind Boys of Alabama onstage at the opening ceremony on World Habitat Day to sing "If I Had a Hammer."

2011
Léogâne, Haiti:  Following the devastating 2010 earthquake, the Carters committed to two consecutive projects in Haiti, a country that even before the earthquake was the poorest in the Western hemisphere. Families had been living in flimsy shelters in a sugar cane field in stifling heat, and were excited as their simple, sturdy new homes went up. Volunteers stayed at a camp called Christianville and were joined by country stars Garth Brooks and Trisha Yearwood, who not only swung hammers but also entertained the volunteers. At a Veterans Day ceremony on the site, President Carter, a U.S. Navy veteran, held his hard hat over his heart during the playing of "The Star-Spangled Banner."

2012
Léogâne, Haiti:  The Carters and even more volunteers returned to Christianville and Léogâne to build houses alongside workers from Haven, an Irish nonprofit. On Sunday morning, President Carter held Sunday school in the mess tent for the volunteers, just as he has for years in Plains. At the worksite, many volunteers from 2011 had tearful reunions with Haitian homeowners they had worked with. Habitat and Haven together built 155 new homes in Haiti during the 2012 project.

2013
Oakland and San Jose, California; Denver, Colorado; New York, New York; and Union Beach, New Jersey: For their 30th project, the Carters worked coast to coast, winding up where it all started, at the Mascot Flats apartment building on the Lower East Side of Manhattan.  In Oakland on Oct. 7, 2013, 300 volunteers sang "Happy Birthday" to President Carter, who had turned 89 on Oct. 1.

2014
The 31st annual work project will be held in the Dallas/Fort Worth area of Texas, beginning October 5.

2015
The 32nd annual work project was scheduled to be held in Pokhara, Nepal, November 1–6, 2015.  It was cancelled on October 8, 2015 because of fuel shortages and civil unrest after the announcement of a new constitution.

2016
Habitat for Humanity's 33rd Carter Work Project was in Memphis, Tennessee, Aug. 21-26, 2016.

2017
Habitat for Humanity's 34th Carter Work Project was in Edmonton, Alberta and Winnipeg, Manitoba, Canada, July 9–14, 2017.

2018
Habitat for Humanity's 35th Carter Work Project was in St. Joseph County, Indiana, August 26-31st.

2019
Habitat for Humanity's 36th Carter Work Project was held in Nashville, Tennessee, Oct. 6-11.

2020
President Carter announced on Oct. 11, 2019 that the 37th Carter Work Project would be held in the Dominican Republic in November 2020.

References

Volunteering
Jimmy Carter
Habitat for Humanity
Recurring events established in 1986
Rosalynn Carter